Iain Fairley (born 29 August 1973) is a rugby union player who made three appearances for the Scotland national rugby union team.

Early life
Fairley was born in Kelso, Scottish Borders.

Rugby playing career
Fairley was selected for Scotland's 1998 Scotland rugby union tour of Oceania but early on he sustained an injury during training.

He made his debut against Italy in 1999 Five Nations Championship. His last appearance was against Spain in the 1999 Rugby World Cup.

In 2002 he was selected for the Scotland 7's team for tournaments in Singapore and Malaysia. He also joined the sevens team that competed at 2002 Commonwealth Games.

The same year he returned to the Borders to play domestic rugby, having been at Edinburgh Reivers.

References

1973 births
Living people
Male rugby sevens players
Rugby union players from Kelso
Rugby union scrum-halves
Scotland international rugby sevens players
Scotland international rugby union players
Scottish rugby union players